
 

Eight Mile Creek is a locality in the Australian state of South Australia located on the state's south-east coast overlooking the body of water known in Australia as the Southern Ocean and by international authorities as the Great Australian Bight.

Boundaries were created on 31 October 1996 for the “long established name” which is derived from the watercourse located within its extent.

The majority land use within the locality is agriculture with a strip of land along the coastline being zoned for both residential use and conservation purposes.  The locality also includes the protected area known as Ewens Ponds Conservation Park which contains the system of natural water bodies known as Ewens Ponds.

The 2016 Australian census which was conducted in August 2016 reports that Eight Mile Creek  had a population of 154 people.

Eight Mile Creek is located within the federal division of Barker, the state electoral district of Mount Gambier and the local government area of the District Council of Grant.

References

Towns in South Australia
Limestone Coast